Underwear Expert started as a men's underwear blog and transitioned to a subscription based online retailer offering a curated underwear subscription with over 50 brands, featuring underwear styles, advice and reviews, fabric glossary, men's underwear trend analysis and style and service-oriented content. According to the New York Times, The Underwear Expert is a "comprehensive website dedicated to researching, testing, reviewing and even curating for sale underpants."

Michael Kleinmann is CEO of the company. Kleinmann was president and COO of Freshpair from 2001 to 2011, before starting up The Underwear Expert. Kleinmann also writes men's underwear articles for The Huffington Post.

While comfort and fit are important when underwear shopping, Kleinmann claims that men’s underwear is now a fashion item, with no less than 600 brands producing them. He compares the underwear movement to sneakers, just another outlet for expression, with many fabric, style and color choices becoming available on the market.

References

External links
Official website
Michael Kleinmann for the Huffington Post
Details Profile
Getting Your Kickstarter Funded: The 4 Elements Of A Successful Project by Michael Kleinmann

Online clothing retailers of the United States
Undergarments
Fashion websites
American blogs
Photoblogs
Kickstarter projects